Forbes Shire is a local government area in the central west region of New South Wales, Australia.  The Shire was formed in 1981 from the amalgamation of the Municipality of Forbes and the Shire of Jemalong resulting from the Local Government Areas Amalgamation Act 1980.

In addition to the town of Forbes, the Shire includes the town and villages of Bedgerebong, Bundbarrah, Corradgery, Daroobalgie, Eugowra, Ooma North and Paytens Bridge and Wirrinya.

Since September 2020, the Mayor of Forbes Shire Council is Cr. Phyllis Miller and Deputy Mayor of Forbes Shire Council is Cr. Chris Roylance, who are both unaligned with any political party.

Council

Current composition and election method
Forbes Shire Council is composed of nine councillors elected proportionally as a single ward. All councillors are elected for a fixed four-year term of office. The mayor is elected by the councillors at the first meeting of the council. The most recent election was held on 10 September 2016, and the makeup of the council is as follows:

The current Council, elected in 2016, in order of election, is:

References 

 
Local government areas of New South Wales
Newell Highway
1981 establishments in Australia